Egware Charles Efemena (born 16 February 1986) is a Nigerian professional footballer who plays as a forward for Sporting Goa in the I-League.

Career
Efemena had played for Simla Youngs, Calcutta Port Trust, and Aryan between 2009 and 2012.

On 6 April 2016 Efemena made his professional football debut for Sporting Goa of the I-League against Aizawl. He started the match and played 63 minutes before be substituted off as Sporting Goa drew the match 1–1.

Career statistics

References

1986 births
Living people
Nigerian footballers
Sporting Clube de Goa players
Association football forwards
I-League players
Expatriate footballers in India
Aryan FC players